Hugh Walter Mason (7 February 1915 – 24 July 2010) was an English rower  who competed at the 1936 Summer Olympics.

Mason was born at Chesterton, the son of Cecil Mason and his wife Norah Evers. He was educated at Cambridge University. In 1936  he was a member of the winning Cambridge boat in the Boat Race.  Later in the year he was a member of the crew of  the eight which came fourth representing  Great Britain at the 1936 Summer Olympics in Berlin. He again rowed for Cambridge in the Boat Race in 1937.

See also
List of Cambridge University Boat Race crews

References

1915 births
2010 deaths
English male rowers
British male rowers
Olympic rowers of Great Britain
Rowers at the 1936 Summer Olympics